Baseball made its second Pacific Mini Games appearance at the 2022 Pacific Mini Games on June 16-24 at the Oleai Sports Complex - Francisco “Tan Ko” M. Palacios Baseball Field in Saipan, Northern Mariana Islands. The Northern Mariana Islands team won the gold medal, defeating Guam by 12–9 in the final.

Competition schedule

Participating nations
As of 1 June 2022, five countries and territories have confirmed their participation in baseball for the games.

Medal summary

Medalists

References

2022 Pacific Mini Games
Pacific Mini Games
2022